Agnes Kharshiing is a women's rights activist in Northeast India. She is the President of the Civil Society Women's Organization (CSWO).

Her outspoken advocacy and leadership of protests for women's and communities' rights has been linked to her detainment.

She has led sit-ins in protest against government evictions of local communities from land. She has spoken out against corporal punishment and bullying in schools. She condemned the appointment of MLA Julius Dorphang, who allegedly raped a 14-year-old girl, as a member of the Assembly Privilege Committee in Meghalaya.

She was arrested then released in March 2013 for use of criminal force to deter a public servant from discharging his duty, as well as criminal trespass. She told reporters that as member of a committee on justice, formed as part of Meghalaya Legal Service Authority, she was trying to help the parents of a rape victim access a media centre. She protested against the eviction drive conducted by Meghalaya Urban Development Authority, for which she was arrested on 9 November 2013.

She was involved in exposing graft and lack of transparency in child nutrition programs. She advocated for programs supporting local food rather than use of contractors. She organised a rescue mission to Radhamadhab Road - a red light area in Silchar, Assam - to deter the alarming growth in child sex trafficking. Prior to this, she had been interacting with a 16 year old survivor who had escaped from Radhamadhab Road.

Fellow activist Angela Rangad said Kharshiing's 2013 arrests were attempts "to suppress any attempt of asking questions and bringing to light largescale illegal deals and land grabs."

Kharshiing has not been deterred from activism by detention. She said:
“I will continue to fight with them for their rights and will not retreat even if I have to face arrest a thousand times”

References

Indian women's rights activists
Indian prisoners and detainees
People from Shillong
Living people
Indian women activists
Activists from Meghalaya
Year of birth missing (living people)